The Tenebrae Responsories by Tomás Luis de Victoria are a set of eighteen motets for four voices a cappella. The late Renaissance Spanish composer set the Responsories for Holy Week known as Tenebrae responsories. They are liturgical texts prescribed for use in the Catholic observances during the Triduum of the Holy Week, in the Matins of Maundy Thursday, Good Friday and Holy Saturday. The compositions were published in Rome in 1585.

The eighteen Tenebrae Responsories are set for four voices each but with a varying disposition of the voices soprano (S), alto (A), tenor (T) and bass (B). Soprano, tenor and bass are at times divided. Six responsories are dedicated to each Matins of Maundy Thursday ("", the Lord's supper), Good Friday, and Holy Saturday ("").

 
  – SATB
  – SSAT (also TTBB)
  – SATB
  – SATB
  – SSAT (also TTBB)
  – SATB
 
  – SATB
  – TTBB (also SSAT)
  – SATB
  – SATB
  – SSAT
  – SATB
 
  – SATB
  – SSAT (also SATB, TTBB)
  – SATB
  – SATB
  – TTBB (and SSAT)
  – SATB

Bibliography 
 

 

Choral compositions
Compositions by Tomás Luis de Victoria